William Bladen (1672–1718) was an English-born Attorney-General in Maryland, in what is now the United States, and briefly Secretary of that Province.  He was the father of Thomas Bladen, Governor of Maryland and was the brother of Colonel Martin Bladen, Commissioner of the Board of Trade and Plantations.  His nephew was Admiral Edward Hawke, 1st Baron Hawke

Family
William was baptised on 21 March 1672/3 at Steeton in Yorkshire.  He was the eldest son of Nathaniel Bladen and Isabella Fairfax, daughter of Sir William Fairfax (soldier) of Steeton.  His father was an attorney who worked as a Steward to Thomas Osborne, 1st Duke of Leeds the Earl of Danby, then later he was Steward to the Countess of Plymouth and the Duchess of Buckingham. Through his mother William was related to Lord Fairfax of Cameron.

Political appointments
After studying to be a lawyer at the Inner Temple, William left England in the Spring of 1692 and went to Maryland.  He arrived there with the new Governor Lionel Copley who was well known to the Bladen family.  William's father was Steward and Copley was a protégé of Danby's, having been his Lt. Governor in Hull and had enjoyed Danby's protection and patronage for many years. Copley took William along to assist with his legal and business matters but the new Governor died within a year. Bladen, however, had already begun to secure appointments in the colony:-

 1692 – Admitted to the Provincial, Cecil County and Prince George County courts
 1693 – Appointed to a Committee to inspect provincial records
 1695 – Clerk of the Lower House (3 years)
 1695 – Clerk of St Mary's County (3 years)
 1696 – Clerk of Indictments – Prince George County (2 years)
 1697 – Deputy Collector of Annapolis (for 5 months only)
 1697 – Surveyor and Searcher of Annapolis (21 years)
 1697 – Clerk of the Upper House (19 years)
 1698 – Clerk of the High Court of Appeals (9 years)
 1698 – Clerk of the council (18 years)
 1698 – Register of Vice-Admiralty Court of Eastern Shore (>5 years)
 1698 – Register of Vice-Admiralty Court of Western Shore (>5 years)
 1698 – Clerk of Free Schools of Annapolis (15 years)
 1698 – Naval Officer of Annapolis (19 years)
 1699 – Clerk of the Prerogative Office (10 months only)
 1701 – Secretary of Maryland (from 16 April to 19 November)
 1703 – Deputy-Surveyor General of Customs (12 years)
 1703 – Appointed to the Court of Anne Arundel County
 1704 – Attorney-General of Maryland (14 years)
 1708 – Alderman of Annapolis (one of the six original Aldermen) (10 years)
 1708 – Commissary General or Judge of Probate (10 years).

A shortage of Clerks in Maryland led to William holding down numerous appointments, often simultaneously. In April 1701, following the death of the previous incumbent Mr Thomas Lawrence Jnr, William petitioned the Council of Trade and Plantations in June to be considered as Secretary to the Colony and had the support of Governor Nathaniel Blakiston and also his father Nathaniel Bladen who lobbied in his support to the Board of Trade in London. He held the post for just a few months but then he was required to step aside when it became known that Sir Thomas Lawrence Senior desired the post. William took up his appointment as Attorney-General to Maryland in January 1704 and held the post until his death in 1718.

Marriage and children
William married Anne van Swearingen at St Inigoes, St Mary's County in Maryland in 1695.  Anne was the daughter of Dutch immigrant Garrett van Swearingen and Mary Smith. They had several children including:
 Anne Bladen (1696–1775), who married Benjamin Tasker Sr. (1690–1768; later Governor of Maryland),
 Thomas Bladen (1698–1780), who married Barbara Janssen (sister to Mary, Lady Baltimore, wife of Charles Calvert Proprietary Governor of Maryland, both being daughters of Sir Theodore Janssen – a French immigrant),
 Others:  Christopher, Priscilla, Martin and William.

Descendants of daughter Anne Tasker (Bladen) would marry into the Carter, Ogle, Dulaney and Lowndes families, many of whom would hold high political office in Maryland

Descendants of son Thomas Bladen (via daughter Harriet) would marry into the Capel family – Earls of Essex.

References

Members of the Inner Temple
History of Maryland
Maryland Attorneys General
1672 births
1718 deaths
Governance of the British Empire
English emigrants